Political corruption is a large concern in Spain. Political corruption is defined as the action or inaction of one or more real persons managing public resources for their own or a third party's benefit to the detriment of all the citizens they should serve and benefit. Transparency International Global Corruption Barometer 2013 shows that the surveyed households consider political parties, Parliament and the judiciary the most corrupt institutions. In fact, the Spanish population considers corruption their second biggest problem, only eclipsed by unemployment.. Following Spain's return to democracy  after the end of the Franco dictatorship, the judiciary became an independent branch of government (despite being governed by a council chosen by the legislative branch of government). In the early part of the 21st century this independent judiciary is active in pursuing political corruption.

On Transparency International's 2022 Corruption Perceptions Index, Spain scored 60 on a scale from 0 ("highly corrupt") to 100 ("very clean"). When ranked by score, Spain ranked 35th among the 180 countries in the Index, where the country ranked first is perceived to have the most honest public sector.  For comparison, the best score was 90 (ranked 1), the worst score was 12 (ranked 180), and the average score was 43.

Transparency International rated Spain between 2001 and 2012. The average value for Spain during that period was 66.67 points with a maximum of 70 points in 2001 and minimum of 61 points in 2009 (100 being no corruption). In 2011 it was rated 30th least corrupt country in the world According to Politico, 1378 officials were prosecuted for corruption between July 2015 and September 2016.

The occurrence of petty corruption is rare in Spain, according to the Global Competitiveness Report of 2015. Bribery is not widespread in business dealings in Spain, yet companies cite corruption as a business impediment. As suggested in the Business Anti-Corruption Portal, anti-corruption strategies should be significantly strengthened at all levels of the government. One example could be to strengthen investigative and prosecution efforts and enforcing existing laws. Corruption in the tax administration is not an obstacle to business (Global Competitiveness Report 2015-2016). Paying taxes has been made less costly by reducing the rates for corporate income, capital gain and environment taxes, and the time required to pay taxes is lower than the OECD countries’ average (DB 2016). Spanish tax regulations represent a moderate challenge for foreign companies.

Among Spain’s police forces, corruption is not widespread and there are only small isolated cases involving police corruption. The police services are considered reliable in protecting companies from crime (Global Competitiveness Report 2015-2016), and the necessary mechanisms are in place to investigate and punish abuse and corruption in the police services. There are isolated reports of police corruption, but these are typically resolved effectively by the authorities (HRR 2014).

Reign of Philip III of Spain

The period 1598 to 1617 in which Francisco Gómez de Sandoval, 1st Duke of Lerma held the government on behalf of Philip III was one of the most notoriously corrupt of Spanish regimes. It was infamous because of the self-enrichment activities of his crony bureaucrat,  Pedro Franqueza, his secretary, Rodrigo Calderón, Count of Oliva and the Duke of Lerma himself.

19th century

The Queen Regent Maria Christina of the Two Sicilies became famous for her involvement in shady deals that divided the people from the elite. Speculation in the production of salt, construction of railways and even the illegal slave trade, which also involved Ramón María Narváez, 1st Duke of Valencia. It was said that there was no industrial project in which the Queen Mother had no interest. Her fortune was estimated at 300 million Spanish reals.

Francoist Spain

The Nationalist military insurgents won the Spanish Civil War against the democratic Republican government. Nazi Germany, Fascist Italy, Britain and the United States supported the 
rebel army and Francoist government in various ways and at various times, but never supported the Second Spanish Republic. During the war, agricultural and industrial production collapsed and the black market - called Straperlo in memory of the homonymous famous scandal -  
acquired great importance. Economic corruption, classism and nepotism were a basic feature of the Francoist Spain and was widespread. Political involvement in it up to the highest levels was absolute: in some cases due to the direct participation of high-ranking officials; in others, due to the protection that the strategists received from power. This took place in an atmosphere of total impunity.

The repercussions of corruption were socially very serious: for the corrupt and their clientele it meant a rapid enrichment, while for most of the population it implied privations of all kinds: famine, ignorance, hunger, ruin and misery. Some of the major cases were: 
 Lost children of Francoism
 Barcelona Traction case
 Case Matesa (in Spanish)
 Reace case (in Spanish)
 Sofico Scandal (in Spanish)

The accession of Juan Carlos I (mentored by Franco from his childhood to perpetuate his legacy) to the Spanish throne saw the advent of a democratic state built on the foundations of the Spanish Constitution of 1978  operated by largely the same institutions that had formerly served Francoist Spain. After some three decades the younger 'democracy generation' of jurists began to investigate issues (in violation of the Pact of forgetting) that had been 'overlooked' by the early reformers in pursuit of creating a peaceful and lasting state which would adopt fully European values at some later time.

Corruption cases in the post-Francoist era

GAL 
In 1987 a judge in his early thirties,  Baltasar Garzón led an investigation which led to the conviction of a former (Socialist) Interior minister, who had adopted a clandestine policy of State terrorism via operations of the  Grupos Antiterroristas de Liberación (GAL), - a collection of criminal gangs who (formerly on the covert behalf of the Falange)(1937–1975) were still fighting Franco's dirty war against the Basque separatist ETA movement. The case was vigorously defended and appealed, to the Constitutional Court of Spain where sentence confirmed by four votes to three, and later endorsed by the European Court of Human Rights

Rumasa and Nueva Rumasa 
Rumasa (Ruiz Mateos SA) was founded in 1961 by the family of José María Ruiz Mateos. It originally exported wine to England. In 1983 it had become very large (allegedly because it was linked to Opus Dei) and so debt-ridden that it was nationalized by the socialist PSOE government of Felipe González "in the public interest".

At the time it consisted of more than 700 companies, with a staff that reached 60,000 people, with an annual turnover of about 350,000 million pesetas (more than 2,000 million euros). Eventually parts of the empire were re-privatized.

The group, was originally rooted primarily in the wine sector, and diversified into banking. Its gradual but massive growth occurred through the acquisition of companies with financial problems so that it became a group of companies that (supposedly) supported each other. RUMASA was present in the following sectors:
 Banking: including the banks , Jerez, Exbank, AVA, Eurobank, Banfisa
 Hospitality: The hotel chain "Hotasa"
 Retail: 22 Department Stores "Galerías Preciados" (since integrated into El Corte Inglés) and Spanish luxury goods "Loewe". (now part of the Louis Vuitton, Moët Hennessy LVMH group)

Following the nationalization of his empire Ruiz-Mateos fled to London and started a series of legal cases to recover some of his seized assets. In 1985 he was arrested at Frankfurt airport and extradited to Spain.

The Francoist-leaning Alianza Popular political party (now integrated into the Popular Party) failed to persuade the constitutional court to reverse the sequestration. The High court eventually received a total of 165 claims from Ruiz-Mateos, and eventually resolved a "fair price" settlement (although the family got nothing)

Twelve years later in 1997 (shortly after the People's Party  government of José María Aznar took power) the High court absolved Ruiz-Mateos from the criminal charges, and in 1999 also the civil actions, so that his bail bonds were returned.

The family started a new company (Nueva Rumasa) with a "Busy Bee" logo that eventually comprised major brands, including:
The Dhul Food Group,  which include brands Cacaolat, Carcesa (which owns Apis conserved tomato products as well as Fruco tomatoes and tomato juice),  Clesa dairy products, Royne ice cream, Chocolates Trapa.
Wine and beverages include Los Conejos & Gabín Garres liquors, rum, rum-punch, sherry, brandy, and other related products.

The company claimed a total of 10,000 employees (the Trade union estimate was 6000) and net worth of almost six billions. It started a huge advertising campaign to attract private investors, and was reprimanded several times by the regulatory authorities, who also issued warnings to existing and potential investors.

In 2011 the firm collapsed with a debt of 700 million Euros spread across some 23 banking institutions, private creditors and government agencies. Most of the debt arose from Dhul an Clesa, which together lost 434 million euros.

In 2012 the founding father José María Ruiz-Mateos was arrested and has again spent time in prison on remand. He is essentially accused of operating a vast pyramid scheme (paying dividends to shareholders from fresh investments). Two of his sons who ran hotels in Andalucia are formal suspects in the ERE trial process.

Naseiro case 
The so-called Naseiro case was a corruption investigation within the People's Party shortly after the arrival of José María Aznar to the party presidency in 1989. A magistrate in the Valencian Community issued an indictment against several members of the People's Party including the party treasurer Rosendo Naseiro and Angel Perales Sanchis, a representative for Valencia, for receiving illegal commissions for the direct awarding of projects and contracts.

Because of the prominence of the accused, the case was heard by the Supreme Court of Spain but shelved for lack of evidence. Nevertheless, the defendants were still strongly suspected of misconduct and expelled from the Popular Party.

Privatisations 
In 1997 the People's Party government of José María Aznar announced the sale of the nation's remaining minority stake (golden shares) in the Telefónica telecommunications company and the petroleum group Repsol YPF. as well as in Endesa, Argentaria and Tabacalera, all major enterprises managed by people close to Aznar, and since been declared illegal by the European Union.

This marked the beginning of a period of privatizations which has continued vigorously under PP administrations. A contested case being the  Madrid region's public health service, in which the bidders are suspected of very close ties with the governing party, and in one case, run by a former regional health minister, Manuel Lamela.

In 2012 privatized or 'externalized' health services contracted by the Madrid public health service cost the region, by some estimates, 345 million euros more than similar activities previously performed by that public sector organization itself.

Gürtel case 

Gürtel is a huge case, code-named after one of its main suspects, construction businessman Francisco Correa. His surname translates to belt in English and to Gürtel in German. The case covers bribery, money laundering and tax evasion, and implicates a wide circle of powerful businessmen and top politicians (90 per cent of the whole party) in the People's Party who had gained an absolute majority in the national elections of Spain.

The affair was first uncovered by the Spanish newspaper El Pais, whose researchers were awarded prizes for investigative journalism. Initial investigations were conducted in Madrid, Valencia & la Costa del Sol by the notable Spanish National Court Judge Baltasar Garzón, an  examining magistrate serving the Juzgado Central de Instrucción No. 5.

Although Manos Limpias was party to the initial process, but as the case focussed on wayward politicians they brought an action against Garzón for investigating Francoist atrocities, which caused delay and confusion for Gürtel as Garzón was suspended for three years pending his eventual acquittal in February 2012, whereupon he was charged and convicted of a completely different crime connected to Gürtel: that of ordering the interception of communications between powerful construction company directors accused of bribing high officials and their lawyers, who were suspected of money laundering. His suspension is pending appeal at the European Court of Human Rights which have previously annulled a similar conviction On 1 June, Prime Minister Rajoy was ousted by a vote of no confidence after the verdict of the court.

Francisco Camps (PP party former)
A part of Gürtel detached in 2009, known as the case of Francisco's suits (caso de los trajes), involved the president of the  Valencia region Francisco Camps who allegedly accepted very expensive bespoke tailoring paid by corrupt businessmen. He was tried by jury in early 2012, and acquitted by a majority verdict. Similar allegations about the high-fashion handbags of the Lady Mayor of Valencia, Rita Barberá Nolla, were dismissed. Camps resigned his presidency to fight his case, but remained a deputy of the Valencia government. Rita Barberá (PP party former) remained in office, but took a beating at the following 2015 city elections. All council members from her list, but her, have been indicted for corruption in another case. She was a senator, and under Spanish law therefore only answerable to a higher court than the one which served those indictments. On April 21, 2016, the investigating judge requested her indictment for money laundering to the Tribunal Supremo. In November she died and therefore all her pending indictments and investigations were suspended.

Luis Bárcenas (PP party former)

The Gurtel case separated material relating to Luis Bárcenas, at the time the treasurer of the PP party. He subsequently accused his former employer of constructive dismissal  Allegedly, concessions for major public infrastructure works were obtained by major construction companies in exchange for secret corporate donations amounting to naked bribery from 1990 onwards -  such funds were kept or accounted-for in the so-called slush fund. Barcenas then used this slush fund to pay extra salaries of between 5000 - 15,000 Euros to party leaders each month, including Spanish Prime Minister Mariano Rajoy and his deputy María Dolores de Cospedal.

Spanish law prohibits senior politicians from receiving any income from sources other than the state institutions by which they are employed for defined official duties, and severely restricts political party funding and political campaign donations.

Large deposits of money amounting to some 38 million euros were found in several foreign bank accounts operated by Barcenas or his agents, suggesting that he may have retained some bribery money for his personal gain.

El País, the national center-left newspaper, published the so-called 'Barcenas papers' outlining some of the transactions for some of the alleged financial fraud. Its center-right rival, El Mundo, later published text messages of support sent by Prime Minister Rajoy to Barcenas, indicating a considerable personal friendship and moral support between the two politicians.

On 27 June 2013 High Court Judge Pablo Ruz ordered former Popular Party (PP) treasurer Luis Bárcenas held in custody without bail until his eventual trial. The judge set bail at 45 million Euro to cover his civil obligations, although the state prosecutor assessed these at a mere 12 million Euro.

ERE in Andalusia 
 (in Spanish Wikipedia)

Employment contract severance conditions in Spain are regulated by law, and usually abbreviated to 'ERE' (expediente de regulación de empleo).

In 2001 the (PSOE) regional government of Andalusia, presided by Manuel Chaves González (later a Minister of State in the national government), gave support to a major commercial supplier of foodstuff (Mercavilla), which was considered to be both strategically important and in financial difficulty. It provided grants for severance packages and subsidised early retirement pensions as well as commissions for services related to such transactions.

In 2008, the conservative opposition alleged that payments were made irregularly, and the Civil Guard presented evidence of a slush fund as well as unjustified payments to persons who were not actually employed, and excessive commissions to trade-union officials and company directors who managed the transactions.

In response, there have been several resignations, probation and bail and even Remand (detention) orders, In August 2013, Chaves resigned and handed power to his deputy in order to deal with the accusations.

On 19 March 2013, as a result of a police operation, Operación Heracles, the examining magistrate, Mrs Mercedes Alaya, ordered the arrest and detention of 20 people who had held significant positions in society.

Palma Arena 
Palma Arena is a velodrome in Palma, Majorca which was allegedly constructed to an inferior specification at an exorbitant cost and with much money diverted to politically connected operators. The former president of the Baleares region, Jaume Matas (Partido Popular), received a six years jail sentence, and other aspects of the case are still under investigation.

Nóos 
The Nóos case is a spinoff of the Palma Arena case. Instituto Nóos was a Foundation (nonprofit) also known as Strategic Studies Association Sponsorship and Patronage and Noos Institute of Applied Research. Apparently it solicited and accepted huge payments from public bodies for major sports promotional activities which were either trivial or never started. Its directors were Diego Torres Pérez and former handball star Iñaki Urdangarin, Duke of Palma the son-in-law of the Spanish King, who also ran a consultancy with his wife, the princess Cristina de Borbón y Grecia.

Powerful officials made strenuous efforts to keep the princess out of the case. In 2013 she accepted a position in Vienna, where she moved with the children of the marriage whilst her husband remained in Barcelona to answer charges.

Millet or Palau de la Música Catalana 
In 2009 the director of the Palau de la Música Catalana in Barcelona, Fèlix Millet Tusell was accused of systematically raiding the coffers of this public body and confessed to embezzling 3.3 million euros. In 2012 he was placed on bail and the prosecutor sought six years imprisonment as well as massive fines.

On 15 January 2018, a court in Barcelona ruled that the Democratic Convergence of Catalonia (CDC, now PDeCAT) had received €6.6 million in illegal commissions from building firm Ferrovial (previously Grupo Ferrovial) between 1999 and 2009, in exchange for public works contracts. The scheme used the Palau de la Música Catalana concert venue as a front for false invoicing. Twelve people were jailed and fined millions. The former CDC treasurer Daniel Osàcar was sentenced to 4 years 5 months in prison and fined €3.7 million for influence peddling and money laundering. Fèlix Millet Tusell was jailed for just under 10 years and fined €4.1 million; his deputy, Jordi Montull, received a 7 year and 6 month sentence and was fined €2.9 million. Millet and Montull were the individuals who benefited most from the scam, as controllers of the Palau’s funds.

Bankia 
Bankia is a Spanish bank which merged several failing financial institutions with largely conservative political leanings. On 11 June 2012, the young political party, Union, Progress and Democracy (UPyD) filed a lawsuit against the directors of Bankia and its main subsidiary for alleged fraud, misappropriation, falsification of financial statements in connection with corporate crime, mismanagement and scheme to alter the price of assets. The Indignant Protesters (M-15) raised 15,000 euros by crowd funding, and filed another lawsuit for false accounting and commercial fraud.

Judge Fernando Andreu agreed to hear both complaints which called 27 defendants which included: Rodrigo Rato (President of Bankia, former conservative economic minister, and former head of the International Monetary Fund), José Luis Olivas (deputy director of Bankia and former conservative president of the Valencia region), Angel Acebes (director of Bankia and former secretary general of the conservative party) and Francisco Verdú (an experienced banker and consultant to the construction industry). Also called as witnesses were a former Governor of the Bank of Spain, Miguel Angel Fernández Ordóñez, the president of the National Securities Market, and the main author of the Bankia audit conducted by Deloitte, Francisco Celma. The court dismissed a request to extend the complaint to four additional Bankia directors who took office after the company was listed on the stock exchange.

Operation Pokémon 

In 2012, an investigation into many Spanish politicians started. The name of the operation comes from the slogan of the Japanese franchise Pokémon, "Gotta catch 'em all", and the large amount of suspects in the investigation.

See also 
 Crime in Spain
 Corruption in Navarre
 International Anti-Corruption Academy
 Group of States Against Corruption
 International Anti-Corruption Day
 ISO 37001 Anti-bribery management systems
 United Nations Convention against Corruption
 OECD Anti-Bribery Convention
 Transparency International

References

External links 

Spain Corruption Profile from the Business Anti-Corruption Portal

External links to Bárcenas case evidence (in Spanish)

 Todos los papeles de Bárcenas, El Pais The secret 'Barcenas Papers' published by a leading newspaper
 Lo que decía el PP cuando los papeles de Bárcenas eran fotocopias,9/07/13 Authenticity of the 'Barcenas Papers
 Bárcenas abre en canal las tripas del PP ante el juez Ruz, 15/07/2013 Barcenas spills the guts of the party secrets
 El 'pendrive' de Bárcenas eleva a 8,3 millones el dinero negro de Génova, 17/07/2013 A USB flash drive reveals increases to the value of the fraud
 La contabilidad b del PP abierta y pública The PP publishes its (audited) accounts
 Excel colaborativo de los supuestos papeles de Bárcenas publicados por El País Spreadsheet of 'Barcenas papers?
 Excel colaborativo de los supuestos papeles de Bárcenas. Una tabla pública y accesibe que recoge todas las donaciones y los pagos a miembros del Partido Popular publicados primero por el diario El País y luego por El Mundo. Un ejercicio de transparencia que puso en marcha en la red en febrero el periodista Antonio Delgado (@adelgado) More investagitive journalism
 EL MUNDO: SUPLEMENTO ESPECIAL PUBLICADO EN LA VERSIÓN IMPRESA EL 17/07/2013 20 years of funds
 Boceto para entender las cuentas de Bárcenas #AdoptaUnaCorrupto Graph of funds flowing into PP

 
Politics of Spain
Crime in Spain by type
Spain
Spain